Staraya Pristan is the name of several rural localities in Russia:
Staraya Pristan, Chelyabinsk Oblast, a village in Aylinsky Selsoviet of Satkinsky District in Chelyabinsk Oblast
Staraya Pristan, Republic of Tatarstan, a village in Laishevsky District of the Republic of Tatarstan